Avoiuli (from Raga  'talk about' and  'draw' or 'paint') is a writing system used by the Turaga indigenous movement on Pentecost Island in Vanuatu. It was devised by Chief Viraleo Boborenvanua over a 14-year period, based on designs found in traditional sand drawings, and intended as a native alternative to the Latin alphabet. It is used mainly for writing in the area's native Raga language, although it can also be used for other languages including Apma, Bislama and English.

Features 
The Avoiuli alphabet comprises characters equivalent to the letters A-Z, decimal numerals and other symbols, including a range of currency symbols representing the livatu and specific items of traditional value such as pigs and dyed mats. Like the Western orthography used to write Raga, it represents the velar nasal ng and prenasalised consonant ngg using modified forms of the letters n and g respectively, but represents the labiovelar consonants bw, mw and vw using digraphs. Although in some respects it is a relatively straightforward imitation of the Latin alphabet, Avoiuli has a few distinctive features. 

Like the sand drawings on which it is based, Avoiuli words are designed to be formed in a single stroke. The script can be written either left-to-right or right-to-left (with the letter shapes reversed, though the majority are symmetrical anyway). It is intended to be written in boustrophedon style, with alternating lines of left-to-right and right-to-left writing, but it is common for it to follow the left-to-right convention of the Latin script. 

Capital letters in Avoiuli are similar to lowercase but are enlarged and drawn around a + shaped 'frame', a feature also seen in traditional sand drawings. Capital letters are not used much in everyday writing.

Students learn to write in Avoiuli at Turaga's traditional school at Lavatmanggemu in north-eastern Pentecost, and at affiliated 'custom schools', paying substantial school fees for the privilege. Avoiuli is also used in record-keeping by the Tangbunia indigenous bank.

Letters 

The letters of Avoiuli script. The Avoiuli digraphs 'BW', 'VW' and 'MW' parallel the Latin convention. There are letters to transliterate the rest of the basic Latin script, as well as additional vowels for other languages of Vanuatu.

Digits 

The digits of Avoiuli script. There are also digits for higher numbers.

References 

Typography
Constructed scripts
Languages of Vanuatu
Penama Province
Writing systems introduced in the 1990s
1990s establishments in Vanuatu